Dean Alan Dugger (September 18, 1933 – March 5, 2000) was an American football player. 

Dugger was born in Philadelphia in 1933 and attended Stonewall Jackson High School in Charleston, West Virginia.

He attended the Ohio State University and played college football at the end position for the Ohio State Buckeyes football team from 1952 to 1954. He was selected by the Football Writers Association of America as a first-team player on its 1954 College Football All-America Team. He was also rated as one of the two best ends in the Midwest, and selected by the Associated Press as a first-team end on the 1954 All-Big Ten Conference football team. 

He was drafted by the Philadelphia Eagles with the 46th pick in the 1955 NFL Draft. He was placed on waivers by the Eagles on September 15.

He was the brother of Jack Dugger.

References

1933 births
2000 deaths
American football ends
Ohio State Buckeyes football players
Sportspeople from Charleston, West Virginia
Players of American football from West Virginia